Freudiana  is a rock opera by Eric Woolfson. It was to be the 11th album by the Alan Parsons Project, but during its development, Woolfson had creative differences with Alan Parsons. The production, released in 1990, utilizes the Project's personnel as well as many guest vocalists.
Alan Parsons later began his career as a solo artist with his 1993 album Try Anything Once, which was musically in a direction more or less continued from that of the Project's 1987's Gaudi.

Woolfson hit upon the idea of researching the life and works of Sigmund Freud with a view to their musical potential after he finished Gaudi. He retraced Freud's footsteps and explored his realms through his homes in London and Vienna (both now museums), as well as literary sources including Freud's classic cases, whose real identities he concealed by use of names such as Wolfman, Ratman, Dora, Little Hans, and Schreber, the Judge. In addition, Freud's writings on his discovery of the 'unconscious', his well-known theories such as the Oedipus Complex, the 'Ego' and the 'Id' and perhaps his best known work, The Interpretation of Dreams all served as springboards for musical ideas. About halfway through the recording process, Woolfson was approached by Brian Brolly to develop the concept still further into a musical. With Brolly's help, Woolfson turned Freudiana into a stage musical. The musical had a successful run, and it was hoped that the show would open in other cities. Further plans were put on hold when a lawsuit broke out between Brolly and Woolfson, each fighting for control of the project. In the end, Brolly won, but the album remained attributed to Eric Woolfson and Alan Parsons.

Releases
This album was released in two versions: The "White Album" and the "Black Album". Additionally, while the "White Album" was originally released under the moniker "Freudiana" and not Eric Woolfson, Alan Parsons, nor the Alan Parsons Project, the first releases had "The Alan Parsons Project" at the top.

The "White Album" was released in 1990 through EMI Records. It includes 18 tracks with lead vocal performances from Leo Sayer, Kiki Dee, Marti Webb, 10cc's Eric Stewart, Frankie Howerd, Gary Howard and the Flying Pickets, as well as previous Project vocalists Chris Rainbow, John Miles, Graham Dye, and Woolfson. Alan Parsons made musical contributions throughout the album as well as writing and producing, as he had with the Project albums. Howard would appear with Parsons' live band on Alan Parsons Live, and Stewart on Parsons' first two solo studio albums, Try Anything Once and On Air.

The Deutsche Originalaufnahme ("German original recording"), also known as the "Black Album", features a double-length cast disc. It contains material from the rock opera. The Black album was the first album credited to Eric Woolfson as a solo artist. Freudiana gave Woolfson a taste of musical theatre and he chose to continue in that end of the business.

Quotes

Track listing (the "White Album")
All songs written by Eric Woolfson except where stated.

"The Nirvana Principle" (Instrumental) – 3:44
"Freudiana" (lead vocal: Eric Woolfson) – 6:20
"I Am a Mirror" (lead vocal: Leo Sayer) – 4:06
"Little Hans" (lead vocal: Graham Dye) (backing vocal: Chris Rainbow) – 3:15
"Dora" (lead vocal: Eric Woolfson) – 3:51
"Funny You Should Say That" (lead vocal: The Flying Pickets) - 4:36
"You're on Your Own" (lead vocal: Kiki Dee) – 3:54
"Far Away from Home" (lead vocal: The Flying Pickets) – 3:11
"Let Yourself Go" (lead vocal: Eric Woolfson) – 5:26
"Beyond the Pleasure Principle" (Instrumental) (Alan Parsons) – 3:13
"The Ring" (lead vocal: Eric Stewart) – 4:22
"Sects Therapy" (lead vocal: Frankie Howerd) – 3:40
"No One Can Love You Better Than Me" (lead vocal: Kiki Dee, Marti Webb, Gary Howard and Eric Woolfson) – 5:40
"Don't Let the Moment Pass" (lead vocal: Marti Webb) – 3:40
"Upper Me" (lead vocal: Eric Stewart) – 5:16
"Freudiana" (Instrumental) – 3:43
"Destiny" (lead vocal: Chris Rainbow) – 0:51
"There But for the Grace of God" (lead vocal: John Miles and Marti Webb) – 5:56

Personnel
 Eric Woolfson – Keyboards, vocals, executive producer
 Alan Parsons – Additional keyboards, engineer, producer
 Andrew Powell – Arrangements, orchestra leader
 Ian Bairnson – Guitar
 Laurie Cottle – Bass
 Richard Cottle – Synthesizer, saxophone
 Stuart Elliott – Drums, percussion

Stage musical version

Freudiana premiered at the Theater an der Wien in Vienna, Austria on 19 December 1990. It was produced by Vereinigte Bühnen Wien. Until 18 April 1992, it played for 380 performances before 320,000 people.

The stage director was Peter Weck. The German song texts were by Lida Winiewicz. Erik was played by Ulrich Tukur.

Track listing, Deutsche Originalaufnahme (the "Black Album")
"Freudiana" (Instrumental) - 3:07
"Kleiner Hans" - 3:08
"Ich bin dein Spiegel" - 4:00
"Es ist durchaus nicht erwiesen" - 4:42
"Dora" - 3:55
"Du bist allein" - 4:24
"Ausgestossen" - 3:58
"Doctor Charcot" - 4:54
"Frau Schmetterling" - 4:11
"Der Ring" - 3:06
"Vision Dora" (Instrumental) - 3:00
"Nie war das Glück so nah" - 3:20
"U-Bahn" - 3:45
"Wer ging den Weg" - 5:04
"Oedipus - Terzett" - 6:25
"Chorus" - 0:58
"Freudiana" - 4:58

Personnel
 Herwig Ursin - production manager, post-processing and mixing
 Fritz Staudinger, Gernot Ursin, Peter Naumann - recording engineers
 Recorded with the HEY-U-Studiomobil at the Theater an der Wien

References

External links
 

1990 albums
Eric Woolfson albums
The Alan Parsons Project albums
Concept albums
Rock musicals
Albums produced by Alan Parsons
EMI Records albums
Composer tributes (classical music)
Rock operas